The Finnish SM-liiga is the name of the professional handball league of Finland.

Competition Format 

The season begins with a regular season between the ten teams. The first six teams qualifies for the play-offs, the teams classified four to eight play another round-robin, while the last two plays a relegation round.

2016/17 Season participants

The following 10 clubs compete in the SM-liiga during the 2016–17 season.

SM-liiga Champions

 1944 : TPS Turku
 1945 : HIFK
 1946 : Union Helsinki
 1950 : Union Helsinki (2)
 1951 : HIFK (2)
 1952 : Karhun Pojat
 1953 : Union Helsinki (3)
 1954 : Karhun Pojat (2)
 1955 : Union Helsinki (4)
 1956 : Karhun Pojat (3)
 1957 : Union Helsinki (5)
 1958 : Union Helsinki (6)
 1959 : Union Helsinki (7)
 1960 : Union Helsinki (8)
 1961 : Arsenal Helsinki
 1962 : Arsenal Helsinki (2)
 1963 : Arsenal Helsinki (3)
 1964 : Union Helsinki (9)
 1965 : HIFK (3)
 1966 : HIFK (4)
 1967 : UK-51 Helsinki
 1968 : BK-46 Karis
 1969 : UK-51 Helsinki (2)
 1970 : UK-51 Helsinki (3)
 1971 : UK-51 Helsinki (4)
 1972 : HIFK (5)
 1973 : HIFK (6)
 1974 : HIFK (7)
 1975 : Sparta Helsinki
 1976 : Sparta Helsinki (2)
 1977 : Sparta Helsinki (3)
 1978 : HC Kiffen
 1979 : BK-46 Karis (2)
 1980 : BK-46 Karis (3)
 1981 : Sjundea IF
 1982 : Sjundea IF (2)
 1983 : BK-46 Karis (4)
 1984 : BK-46 Karis (5)
 1985 : BK-46 Karis (6)
 1986 : BK-46 Karis (7)
 1987 : BK-46 Karis (8)
 1988 : BK-46 Karis (9)
 1989 : BK-46 Karis (10)
 1990 : Sjundea IF (3)
 1991 : BK-46 Karis (11)
 1992 : BK-46 Karis (12)
 1993 : Dicken
 1994 : BK-46 Karis (13)
 1995 : BK-46 Karis (14)
 1996 : BK-46 Karis (15)
 1997 : BK-46 Karis (16)
 1998 : BK-46 Karis (17)
 1999 : GrIFK
 2000 : HC Dennis
 2001 : HC Dennis (2)
 2002 : BK-46 Karis (18)
 2003 : BK-46 Karis (19)
 2004 : HC Dennis (3)
 2005 : Sjundea IF (4)
 2006 : BK-46 Karis (20)
 2007 : Riihimäki Cocks
 2008 : Riihimäki Cocks (2)
 2009 : Riihimäki Cocks (3)
 2010 : Riihimäki Cocks (4)
 2011 : HC West 
 2012 : HC West (2)
 2013 : Riihimäki Cocks (5)
 2014 : Riihimäki Cocks (6)
 2015 : Riihimäki Cocks (7)
 2016 : Riihimäki Cocks (8)
 2017 : Riihimäki Cocks (9)
 2018 : Riihimäki Cocks (10)
 2019 : Riihimäki Cocks (11)
 2020 : BK-46 Karis (21)
 2021 : Dicken (2)

EHF coefficient ranking
For season 2017/2018, see footnote

19.  (27)  1.liga (14.67)
20.  (19)  Extraliga (11.67)
21.  (22)  SM-liiga (11.25)
21.  (24)  Eerste Klasse (11.25)
23.  (32)  Lotto Eredivisie (10.78)

References

External links
 msm.finnhandball.net

SM-Liiga
Finland
Professional sports leagues in Finland